Fantastic Star is the ninth studio album by the British singer/songwriter Marc Almond. It was released in 1996 and reached number fifty-four on the UK Albums Chart. It includes the singles "Adored and Explored", "The Idol", "Child Star" and the double A-side "Brilliant Creatures" / "Out There". The album was Almond's last on a major record label until 2007's Stardom Road.

Accompanied by studio musicians and collaborators - specifically guitarist Neal X and John Coxon - Almond recorded the songs for the album over several years. This was due to his changing record labels and professional and personal difficulties. It was recorded at Red Bus Studios, London, The Stereo Society, New York, Skyline, New York, and GCHQ, London. Receiving mixed to positive reviews, the album was originally released as a CD and cassette in February 1996. The album has not been reissued. The artwork was designed by 950 Fahrenheit with a cover photograph by Mike Owen.

Background
Marc Almond records had sold very well during the initial years of the 1990s. It was expected in the business that his new album which would be Fantastic Star would sell very well. Therefore, the record companies involved were prepared to spend money on the project. Originally the album was intended to be released by WEA UK and initially the sole producer was to be Soft Cell producer Mike Thorne under the working title Urban Velvet reflecting the Glam meets Electronica fusion. However, Marc Almond's manager Stevo Pearce had the project moved to Phonogram Records. Based on this the new record company decided to bring new producers and remixers and even add new songs to the original project. Beatmasters, Martyn Ware and others reworked or created new songs to varying degrees of satisfaction and displeasure for Almond.

Release
The first single from the album, "Adored and Explored" and remixed by the Beatmasters, reached No. 25 in the UK Singles Chart. Despite a radio jingle version for the then top rated Chris Evans Radio 1 Breakfast Show, second single "The Idol" just missed the UK top 40, stalling at No. 44. Christmas saw the third single release, "Child Star", which fared slightly better than "The Idol", but it just missed the top 40, halting at No. 41. After the album was released, a further double A-side single "Brilliant Creatures"/"Out There" was released but missed the top 75, reaching  No. 76. Almond had addiction problems during the recording of this album and refers to it in his autobiography as 'Fading Star'.

Reception

Fantastic Star received good to mixed reviews from the majority of critics. The album was released to disappointing sales reaching UK No. 54.

Track listing

Personnel
Marc Almond – vocals, synthesizer, background vocals
Neal X – guitar
Rick Shaffer – guitar
Chris Spedding – guitar
Martyn Ware – keyboards
B.J. Nelson, Betty, Morton Street Local 10014 – background vocals
David Johansen – harmonica on "We Need Jealousy", "Adored and Explored" and "Love to Die For"
John Cale – piano on "Love to Die For"
Andy Ross – guitar on "The Edge of Heartbreak"
Jeremy Stacey – percussion on "The Edge of Heartbreak"
Mandy Drummond, Chris Pitsillides – viola on "The Edge of Heartbreak"
Anne Stephenson, Gini Ball, Johnny Taylor – violin on "The Edge of Heartbreak"

Chart performance

References

1996 albums
Marc Almond albums
Mercury Records albums
Albums produced by Mike Hedges
Albums produced by Mike Thorne